Olga Sorkine-Hornung (born 1981)  is a professor of Computer Science at ETH Zurich working in the fields of computer graphics, geometric modeling and geometry processing. She has received multiple awards, including the ACM SIGGRAPH Significant New Researcher Award in 2011.

Awards
2020: Fellow of the  Association for Computing Machinery (ACM)
2017: Rössler Prize (accompanied by CHF 200,000 in research funds)
2017: EUROGRAPHICS Outstanding Technical Contributions Award
2016: Best Paper Award at the International Conference on 3D Vision (3DV) 2016
2015: Symposium on Geometry Processing Software Award for libigl, a C++ geometry processing library
2015: Fellow of the Eurographics Associationlibrary
2014: Best Paper Award at Eurographics Symposium on Geometry Processing 2014
2013: Intel Early Career Faculty Award
2012: ERC Starting Grant
2012: Latsis Prize of ETH Zurich
2011: ACM SIGGRAPH Significant New Researcher Award
2008: EUROGRAPHICS Young Researcher Award
2006-2008: Alexander von Humboldt research fellowship
2003: Excellence award, School of Computer Science, Tel Aviv University
1999-2000: Dean’s List of Excellence, Raymond and Beverly Sackler Faculty of Exact Sciences, Tel Aviv University

References

Living people
1981 births
Academic staff of ETH Zurich
Tel Aviv University alumni
Academics from Moscow